Ska Satellite was started by Moon Ska Records as a way to produce smaller acts on a lower budget.

Bands on Ska Satellite Label
 Army of Juan
 Buford O'Sullivan
 Can't Say
 The Checkered Cabs
 Critical Mass
 Edna's Goldfish
 Highball Holiday
 Johnny Too Bad and the Strikeouts
 One Groovy Coconut
 The Robustos
 The Strangeways

Discography
MR9001 :: Highball Holiday : Self Titled : CD : 1997
MR9002 :: Army Of Juan : Self Titled : CD : 1997
MR9003 :: Johnny Too Bad And The Strikeouts : Patchwork Girl : CD : 1997
MR9004 :: The Robustos : Introducing…The Robustos : CD : 1997
MR9005 :: The Go Go Rays : Family Fun Night : CD : 1997 
MR9006 :: Buford O'Sullivan : The Club Of Hopes & Fears : CD : 1999
MR9007 :: Critical Mass : ¡Give It Up, Let It Go! : CD :1997
MR9008 :: Can't Say : True Grit : CD : 1997
MR9009 :: Never issued, but planned for Irradicats :: Blueska : CD			
MR9010 :: Checkered Cabs : Remember : CD : 1998
MR9011 :: Edna's Goldfish : Before You Knew Better : CD : 1997
MR9012 :: The Strangeways : Corporate Monkey : CD : 1998
MR9013 :: One Groovy Coconut : More Like This Than That : CD : 1998

See also
 List of record labels
 Moon Ska Europe
 Moon Ska Records
 Ska

American record labels
Ska record labels